Époqu'auto is a classic auto show dealing with all the themes of vintage vehicles (vintage cars, but also those of bicycles, motorcycles, trucks and accessories). It takes place every year in Lyon on the Eurexpo site.

References

External links
 Official site

Exhibitions in France
Auto shows